Swamp Song may refer to:

Entertainment
"Swamp Song", a song by Duff McKagan from his 1993 album Believe in Me
"Swamp Song", a song by progressive rock band Tool from their 1993 album Undertow
"The Swamp Song", a song by Oasis from their 1995 single Wonderwall
"Swamp Song", a song by Blur from their 1999 album 13